The 2015 GP2 Series season was the forty-ninth season of the second-tier of Formula One feeder championship and also eleventh season under the GP2 Series moniker, a championship for open-wheel racing cars run as a support series to the 2015 Formula One World Championship. Twenty-six drivers representing thirteen teams raced over eleven rounds, starting in Bahrain on 18 April and finishing in Abu Dhabi on 29 November.

Rule changes
The series continued to use the Dallara GP2/11 chassis first introduced in 2011, but introduced the Drag Reduction System (DRS), akin to that used in Formula One. The series used the same detection and activation points at each circuit as Formula One, and followed the same rules for activation, requiring drivers to be within one second of the car in front at the detection point for DRS to become available. The upper-element rear wing angle has a same angle as Formula One upper-element rear wing. In an event of rainy conditions, Drag Reduction Systems are automatically deactivated until the rain stopped.

Teams and drivers

Team changes
 GP3 Series team Status Grand Prix expanded its operations to enter the GP2 Series, replacing Caterham Racing after team principal Teddy Yip reached an agreement with Caterham's Tony Fernandes to purchase the team at the end of the 2014 season.
 Russian Time ended its association with  iSport International, with the responsibility for the team's operations taken over by Virtuosi Racing.

Driver changes
Changing teams
 René Binder moved from Arden International to Trident.
 Sergio Canamasas moved from Trident to MP Motorsport.
 Pierre Gasly, who raced for Caterham Racing, will switch to DAMS.
 Rio Haryanto switched from Caterham Racing to Campos Racing.
 Raffaele Marciello, who raced for Racing Engineering, will switch to Trident.
 Alexander Rossi, who raced for Caterham Racing and Campos Racing will move to Racing Engineering.
 Marco Sørensen, who raced for MP Motorsport, will switch to Carlin.
 Johnny Cecotto Jr., who raced for Trident, will switch to Hilmer Motorsport.

Entering GP2
 2014 Formula Renault 3.5 Series driver Zoël Amberg will switch to the series, joining Lazarus.
 Jordan King, who previously competed in European Formula 3, will make his GP2 debut with Racing Engineering.
 GP3 Series champion Alex Lynn will graduate to the series with reigning champions DAMS.
 Nobuharu Matsushita, the 2014 All-Japan Formula Three champion, will make his GP2 debut with ART Grand Prix.
 Norman Nato, who previously competed in Formula Renault 3.5, will make his GP2 debut with Arden International.
 Sergey Sirotkin will move from the Formula Renault 3.5 series, to join the Rapax Team.
 Marlon Stöckinger, who raced for Status Grand Prix in the 2012 GP3 Series season, will return to the team after two seasons in the Formula Renault 3.5 Series.
 Robert Vișoiu will graduate to the series with Rapax.
 Richie Stanaway, who previously competed in GP3, will graduate to the series with Status.
 Nick Yelloly, who previously competed in GP3, will graduate to the series with Hilmer.

Leaving GP2
 2014 season champion Jolyon Palmer will not return to defend his title as, under the series regulations, a driver is not allowed to continue in the series once they have won the championship. He has taken up duties as reserve driver for Lotus F1.
 Stéphane Richelmi left DAMS and the series to join the Blancpain Endurance Series and Blancpain Sprint Series with Belgian Audi Club Team WRT.
 Tom Dillmann, Tio Ellinas and Nicholas Latifi left the series to race with Carlin, Strakka Racing and Arden respectively in Formula Renault 3.5.
 Takuya Izawa left ART Grand Prix and the series to return to Super Formula and Super GT.
 Felipe Nasr left Carlin and the series to join the Sauber Formula One team.
 Stefano Coletti left GP2 to race in IndyCar with KV Racing Technology.
 Adrian Quaife-Hobbs left Rapax and the series to join the Blancpain Endurance Series with Von Ryan Racing.
 Daniel Abt left the series to race in Formula E with the Audi Sport Abt Formula E Team.

Mid-season changes
 Johnny Cecotto Jr. replaced Marco Sørensen at Carlin for the Silverstone round of the championship. Cecotto was replaced for the following round at the Hungaroring by Carlin regular Sean Gelael. Gelael due to his Formula Renault 3.5 Series obligations was replaced by the Carlin GP3 Series driver Jann Mardenborough at Monza.

Calendar
In December 2014, the full 2015 calendar was revealed with eleven events.

Calendar changes
 The series was scheduled to run in support of the German Grand Prix, at a venue that, at the time of the calendar's publication, had not yet been decided. With the cancellation of the German Grand Prix, the planned GP2 meeting was rescheduled to Bahrain International Circuit in the 2015 6 Hours of Bahrain weekend.

Results

Summary

Championship standings
Scoring system
Points were awarded to the top 10 classified finishers in the Feature race, and to the top 8 classified finishers in the Sprint race. The pole-sitter in the feature race also received four points, and two points were given to the driver who set the fastest lap inside the top ten in both the feature and sprint races. No extra points were awarded to the pole-sitter in the sprint race.

Feature race points

Sprint race points
Points were awarded to the top 8 classified finishers.

Drivers' championship
Due to a first lap accident resulting in barriers needing to be repaired, the first race at Sochi was shortened to 15 laps instead of the 28 originally scheduled, and as a result half points were awarded.

The second race at Yas Marina was cancelled after a first lap accident, during which four cars made contact with the barriers on the outside of turn 3.  The race was red-flagged, then abandoned as the barriers were not sufficiently repaired in time to restart the race.  As less than 2 laps were completed, no result was reached and no points were awarded.

Notes:
† — Drivers did not finish the race, but were classified as they completed over 90% of the race distance.

Teams' championship

Notes:
† — Drivers did not finish the race, but were classified as they completed over 90% of the race distance.

Notes

References

External links
 GP2 Series official website

GP2 Series
GP2 Series seasons
GP2 Series